February 29 is a 2006 South Korean film and the first installment of the 4 Horror Tales film series. It was followed by Forbidden Floor, Roommates and Dark Forest.

Plot
In this tale Ji-yeon is a tollgate ticket girl who is frightened by the driver of a mysterious black car when he hands her a bloodstained ticket at midnight. Her fear deepens after her colleague, Jong-sook, tells her that 12 years earlier a prisoner transport vehicle caused a traffic accident wherein all the prisoners involved died - and some of the corpses disappeared. Since then, a murder has occurred near the tollgate on February 29, every four years. Calamity soon follows.

References

External links 
 https://web.archive.org/web/20090902051624/http://cjent.co.kr/4horrors
 
 
 

2006 films
2006 horror films
South Korean horror films
South Korean ghost films
South Korean serial killer films
Films about curses
2000s Korean-language films
2000s South Korean films